The Best of Emerson, Lake & Palmer is an album by British progressive rock band Emerson, Lake & Palmer, released in 1994.
This supersedes a 1980 compilation with a shorter, different track list and Japanese ukiyo-e cover.

Track listing
The Best of Emerson, Lake & Palmer has a running time of 76 minutes and 49 seconds spread amongst fourteen tracks, one of which has multiple sections:

 "From the Beginning" (Greg Lake) (4:13)
 "Jerusalem" (William Blake, Hubert Parry, arr. by Keith Emerson, Lake, Carl Palmer) (2:44)
 "Still...You Turn Me On" (Lake) (2:53)
 "Fanfare for the Common Man" (Aaron Copland) (Single version) (2:57)
 "Knife-Edge" (Leoš Janáček, J. S. Bach, arr. by Emerson) (5:05)
 "Tarkus" (Emerson, Lake) (20:35)
 "Eruption" (2:43)
 "Stones of Years" (3:44)
 "Iconoclast" (1:15)
 "Mass" (3:11)
 "Manticore" (1:52)
 "Battlefield" (3:51)
 "Aquatarkus" (3:59)
 "Karn Evil 9: 1st Impression, Pt. 2" (Emerson, Lake) (4:43)
 "C'est la Vie" (Lake, Peter Sinfield) (4:16)
 "Hoedown" (Copland) (3:43)
 "Trilogy" (Emerson, Lake) (8:53)
 "Honky Tonk Train Blues" (Meade "Lux" Lewis, arr. by Emerson) (3:09)
 "Black Moon" (Emerson, Lake, Palmer) (Single version) (4:46)
 "Lucky Man" (Lake) (4:37)
 "I Believe in Father Christmas" (Lake) (Original single version) (3:30)

Original 1980 track listing
Original had only 9 tracks.

1984 German Track listing
The German version has different versions of tracks 1, 5, 6, and 8 and three additional tracks.

Charts

Certifications

References

Albums produced by Mark Mancina
Albums produced by Greg Lake
Albums produced by Keith Emerson
Albums produced by Carl Palmer
Best of Emerson, Lake and Palmer, The
Best of Emerson, Lake and Palmer, The
Atlantic Records compilation albums